Charleston Municipal Airport  is a city-owned, public-use airport located two nautical miles (4 km) south of the central business district of Charleston, a city in Tallahatchie County, Mississippi, United States. It is included in the National Plan of Integrated Airport Systems for 2011–2015, which categorized it as a general aviation facility.

Facilities and aircraft 
Charleston Municipal Airport covers an area of 47 acres (19 ha) at an elevation of 175 feet (53 m) above mean sea level. It has one runway designated 18/36 with an asphalt surface measuring 3,000 by 50 feet (914 x 15 m). For the 12-month period ending January 4, 2012, the airport had 5,700 general aviation aircraft operations, an average of 15 per day.

See also 
 List of airports in Mississippi

References

External links 
 Aerial image as of February 1996 from USGS The National Map
 

Airports in Mississippi
Buildings and structures in Tallahatchie County, Mississippi
Transportation in Tallahatchie County, Mississippi